Max Reed may refer to:
 Max Reed (Australian footballer)
 Max Reed (American football)